Christine S. Calvo is a Guamanian businesswoman and former First Lady of Guam from 2011 to 2019.

Early life 
Calvo was born in Guam. Calvo graduated from Notre Dame High School in Talofofo, Guam.

Career 
Calvo is the president and owner of Todu Marketing LLC, a graphic and printing business in Guam.

In sports, Calvo is the manager of the Guam Rugby Football Union and Women’s Team. Calvo is the head coach of the Academy of Our Lady of Guam and the St. Francis Catholic School girls’ rugby teams.

On November 2, 2010, when Eddie Baza Calvo won the election as the Governor of Guam, Calvo became the First Lady of Guam. Calvo served as First Lady of Guam on January 3, 2011, until January 7, 2019.

On November 23, 2012, Calvo invited the women of Guam to wear red to the Random Women’s Rally at the Paseo de Susana Loop in Guam.

Calvo is an honorary chairperson of the Guam Memorial Hospital Volunteers Association. In 2015, as First Lady of Guam, Calvo hosted the GMH Volunteers Association's annual membership tea at the government house in Agana Heights.

Personal life 
Calvo's husband is Eddie Baza Calvo, a politician and former Governor of Guam. They have six children.

References

External links 
 First Lady Christine Calvo with Patti Arroyo at pncguam.com
 Christine S. Calvo image in FOCUS October 6, 2014 at mbjguam
 Governor Proclaims Women’s History Month; First Lady Remembers Women Who Have Contributed to Guam at pncguam.com

First Ladies and Gentlemen of Guam
Guamanian Republicans
Guamanian women in politics
Year of birth missing (living people)
Living people
21st-century American women